Brigitte Amm is a retired East German rower who won one gold and four silver medals at European championships between 1961 and 1966.

At the 1961 East German national championships she became national champion with the women's eight. The women's eight, made up solely of rowers from SCW DHfK Leipzig, was sent to the 1961 European Rowing Championships in Prague, Czechoslovakia, where they won silver. In December 1961, seven of the eight rowers were given a Master of Sport award (Gisela Schirmer and their coxswain missed out).

References

Year of birth missing (living people)
Living people
East German female rowers
Recipients of the Master of Sport
European Rowing Championships medalists